Maestro (also known informally as Air Maestro) was an airline based in Sainte-Foy, Quebec City, Canada. It operated charter services.

The airline ceased operations on 7 March 2007, after a decision was made to halt all flights because of overcapacity in the Quebec market.

History
Maestro was established in April 2006 and started operations on 12 December 2006. It was a privately funded start-up airline and the exclusive carrier of tour operator Vacances Maestro, based in Quebec City. Its logo was an airplane empennage over an inclined white Fleur-de-lis, which symbolizes both Quebec and Quebec City. On March 7, 2007, the company announced its bankruptcy and closed definitively.

Destinations

As of March 2007, Maestro operated flights to:

Acapulco (General Juan N. Álvarez International Airport)
Cayo Coco (Cayo Coco Airport)
Fort-de-France (Le Lamentin Airport)
Fort Lauderdale (Fort Lauderdale-Hollywood International Airport)
Holguín (Frank País Airport)
La Romana (La Romana International Airport)
Panama City (Tocumen International Airport)
Pointe-à-Pitre (Pointe-à-Pitre International Airport)
Porlamar/Isla Margarita
Quebec City (Québec/Jean Lesage International Airport) hub
Samaná (Samaná El Catey International Airport)
San Andres (Gustavo Rojas Pinilla International Airport)
Santa Clara/Cayo Santa Maria (Abel Santa María Airport)
Varadero (Juan Gualberto Gómez Airport)

Fleet
Skyservice Airlines operated all Maestro flights using a Boeing 757-200ER aircraft.

See also 
 List of defunct airlines of Canada

References

Defunct airlines of Canada
Transport in Quebec City
Airlines established in 2006
Airlines disestablished in 2007
Companies based in Quebec City
2006 establishments in Quebec
2007 disestablishments in Quebec